The Bärenhorn is a mountain of the Lepontine Alps, situated between Vals and Rheinwald in Graubünden, on territory of both municipalities. The northeastern face lies on territory of Safien.

A popular hike starts at Zervreila, passes three remote lakes (Guraletschsee, Amperveilsee and Selvasee) and descends via Selva Alp to Vals. Vals is famous for its spa.

References

External links
 Bärenhorn on Hikr

Mountains of the Alps
Vals, Switzerland
Rheinwald
Mountains of Graubünden
Two-thousanders of Switzerland